Ali Al Numairy (1956 - March 7, 2013) was the Vice President of the Arab Medical Union, the World Vice President of International College of Surgeons, President ICS UAE Section President of Plastic Surgery Society – Emirates Medical Association. Director General and Head of Plastic & Aesthetic Surgery Dept. Gulf Specialty Hospital – Dubai and former head of the burns section at Rashid Hospital

Ali Al-Numairy was born in 1956. The first plastic surgeon in the United Arab Emirites specialized in the field. He was a plastic and cosmetic surgeon.

Establishing himself 
His fascination for medicine started with the extraction of a tooth. At the age of 14 years in school, it was necessary to take penicillin injections on a daily basis, for a few days after the extraction. He was interested in the idea of doing it himself. During those periods there were no disposable syringes and so everything had to be sterilized carefully. The future doctor carried out the operation at home. Then he arranged a kit and started dissecting animals rabbits and hens.

Career 
After graduating from the University of Cairo in 1979, he started work at the Department of Health & Medical Services, Government of Dubai. He had an active career since 1980, working in different hospitals around Lyon, France, studying reconstruction, microsurgery, transplantation, maxillo-facial and aesthetic surgery. After four years he returned to the Department of Health & Medical Services, Dubai as a Registrar in 1990 and was promoted to Consultant Plastic Surgeon and the head of Plastic Surgery & Burn unit for the Department of Health & Medical Services. He was the founder and president of the Plastic Surgery Society of the Emirates Medical Association.

Achievements  
Vice president of Arab Medical Union since 2010,

President of ICS UAE Section since 2009, 

World Vice President of International College of Surgeons ICS since 2010,

Visiting Professor of Surgery, Sharjah University, UAE,

President of the UAE Plastic Surgery Society - EMA,

Secretary General, GCC Association of Plastic Surgeons (Gulf Co-operative Council Countries).  

since 2007,
Sworn in member of the Higher Committee of the Medical Liability in the UAE,

Member of the Medical legislation committee in the UAE, 

Member of the Higher Committee of Health Research in the UAE,   

General Secretary e-Health Scientific Society (e-HSS),

Founder of the Emirati biker group called UAE Tigers.

Death
On March 7, 2013, at almost 9:35 pm while riding home on his Harley-Davidson motorcycle, Numairy was struck and killed by a driver who was suspected of running a red light. The ruler of Dubai paid condolences to his family.

References

External links 

 International Wound Conference MEBO https://web.archive.org/web/20120325161648/http://en.mebo.com/Article/ShowInfo.asp?InfoID=406
 International Journal of Cosmetic Surgery http://www.ijcs.org/about/editor.php
 Al Ithihad News http://www.alittihad.ae/details.php?id=48288&y=2011
 International College of Surgeons https://web.archive.org/web/20110723112108/https://www.icsglobal.org/members/mem_intnl_officers.asp
 A cut to give a lift to self-esteem Gulf News http://gulfnews.com/news/gulf/uae/health/a-cut-to-give-a-lift-to-self-esteem-1.43088
 UAE's drive for healthier future Arabian Business http://www.arabianbusiness.com/uae-s-drive-for-healthier-future-17327.html
 2nd Annual scientific e Health conference https://web.archive.org/web/20120328112731/http://ehealth.hbmeu.ac.ae/Program/KeynoteAddresses/PhysiciansProspective.aspx
 A Brilliant Journey, a Great Harvest https://web.archive.org/web/20120325161656/http://en.mebo.com/Article/ShowInfo.asp?InfoID=353

 Al Tajmeel 
 gshdubai
 

Emirati plastic surgeons
2013 deaths
1956 births